Ellezelles is a municipality of Wallonia located in the province of Hainaut, Belgium. 

It consists of the following districts: Ellezelles, Lahamaide, and Wodecq. Bordering Flanders, the town is home to a minority of Dutch-speakers.

The village archives contain a document "attesting" to the birth of Hercule Poirot on 1 April 1850.

Notable people 
 Lamoral, Count of Egmont, Prince of Gavere (1522 in La Hamaide near Ellezelles – executed in 1568) a general and statesman in the Spanish Netherlands just before the start of the Eighty Years' War.
 Richard Ely (born 1974 in Ellezelles) a Belgian writer, journalist and ethnobotanist.

References

External links 
 

Municipalities of Hainaut (province)
Belgium geography articles needing translation from French Wikipedia